William Garrett Stroshein (born April 4, 1980) is a Canadian former professional ice hockey forward who primarily played as an Enforcer. He played in three games in the National Hockey League for the Washington Capitals during the 2003–04 NHL season.

Career statistics

External links 

1980 births
Living people
Bakersfield Condors (1998–2015) players
Canadian ice hockey forwards
Chilliwack Chiefs players
Fresno Falcons players
Mobile Mysticks players
Portland Pirates players
Providence Bruins players
Richmond Renegades players
San Diego Gulls (WCHL) players
Seattle Thunderbirds players
South Carolina Stingrays players
Ice hockey people from Edmonton
Trenton Devils players
Undrafted National Hockey League players
Washington Capitals players